Angelos Tsingaras (born 24 July 1999) is a Greek professional footballer who plays as a defensive midfielder for Super League club Panetolikos.

Personal life
Tsingaras' younger brother, Theocharis, is also a professional footballer.

Career statistics

Club

References

External links

1999 births
Living people
Greek footballers
Greece under-21 international footballers
Greece youth international footballers
Super League Greece players
Panetolikos F.C. players
Association football midfielders
Footballers from Moudania